Sanjar Kodirkulov (born 27 May 1997 in Tashkent, Uzbekistan) is an Uzbekistani footballer who currently plays for Bunyodkor.

Career statistics

Club

International

Statistics accurate as of match played 19 November 2019

International goals
Scores and results list Uzbekistan's goal tally first.

References

External links 
 

Uzbekistani footballers
1997 births
Living people
FC Bunyodkor players
Association football midfielders
Uzbekistan international footballers